Giles Cotton, also known as Silas Cotton, (died 1883 or 1884) was an emancipated slave, farmer, and state legislator in Texas. A Radical Republican, he served in the Texas House of Representatives during the Reconstruction era from 1870 to 1873. He married and had seven children.

Life 
Cotton, the son of a slave woman and a white plantation overseer, was born into slavery in South Carolina and was illiterate throughout his life. According to the Handbook of Texas, Cotton's owner was most likely Ethan Stroud at the time of his birth. Cotton's owner changed to by Ethan Shroud's son, Logan Shroud, after Ethan Shroud's death in 1847. While a slave to Logan Shroud, Cotton was permitted to own mules and a wagon, serving as a teamster for Shroud.

He was emancipated from slavery following the American Civil War and moved to Calvert, Texas. In 1869, he was elected to serve in the Twelfth Texas Legislature in the Texas House of Representatives, where he served from 1870 until 1873.

Political positions 
Cotton was a Radical Republican. In 1871, Cotton voted to prohibit the public carrying of weapons, including pistols, knives, slingshots, and sword-canes. At the time, he was one of twelve black legislators in the Texas House of Representatives.

Family 
According to The Handbook of Texas, Cotton married a woman by the name of "Miley" prior to 1840. On September 5, 1870, Cotton married a woman named Rachel. That same year, U.S. census reported that the newlywed couple had seven children living in their household. Owing to his many children, he was "recognized as the father of all the Cottons in Limestone and Robertson counties."

See also
African-American officeholders during and following the Reconstruction era

References

1814 births
1883 deaths
African-American state legislators in Texas
19th-century American farmers
Members of the Texas House of Representatives
19th-century American politicians
Radical Republicans
19th-century American slaves
Texas Republicans
Gun control advocates
American freedmen